The Langkloof Mountains are a short mountain range within the Cape Fold Belt in the Western Cape of South Africa. They form a link between the Outeniqua and Tsitsikamma mountains to the north of Plettenberg Bay in the Garden Route region. They stretch from Prince Alfred's Pass in the west to just north of Nature's Valley and south of Joubertina.

Mountain ranges of the Western Cape